Globularia sarcophylla is a plant endemic to Gran Canaria, where it is rare and confined to basalt mountain cliffs of the Caldera de Tirajana, Los Leales, La Culata etc. around  in elevation. The flowers are blue.

References

Bramwell, D. and Z. Bramwell. Wild Flowers of the Canary Islands. Editorial Rueda, Madrid, España. 2001.

External links
http://www.phengels.fr/macro12-93.html
http://botany.cz/cs/globularia-sarcophylla/
http://www.magrama.gob.es/es/biodiversidad/temas/inventarios-nacionales/653_tcm7-149472.pdf
http://plantasdemitierra.blogspot.no/2007/09/globularia-sarcophylla.html
http://www.explore-kew-gardens.net/engMarch/textMM/conservation1N.

sarcophylla
Endemic flora of the Canary Islands
Endemic flora of Macaronesia